Centro Universitário Curitiba (abbreviated UNICURITIBA)  is a Brazilian Higher Education institution.

External links
Homepage

 
1950 establishments in Brazil